Vasily Sokolov may refer to:

 Vasily Pavlovich Sokolov (1902–1958), Russian and Soviet major general
 Vasily Sokolov (footballer) (1912–1981), Russian football defender and coach